The SS Asia was a Canadian passenger steamship and package freighter of the Northwestern Transportation Company. Launched at St. Catharines, Ontario in 1873, she was built as a canaller, a vessel designed for use in the Welland Canal and other enclosed watercourses of the day. She was converted by her owners for services in the open Great Lakes. Heavily laden and top-heavy with freight, she sank near Lonely Island in Georgian Bay on 14 September 1882 with a loss of 123 lives. The doomed vessel had been fitted with flimsy lifeboats, which repeatedly overturned in the heavy waters. A lifeboat that had originally saved 18 officers and passengers from the foundering Asia then capsized over and over in storm conditions, leading to the deaths of most of the castaways. By the time the one remaining lifeboat made land near Parry Sound, only two passengers remained alive.

In history
The survivors were two teenage-aged young adults, Christina Ann Morrison and Duncan Tinkis.  The loss of life made this disaster, in terms of loss of life from the sinking of a single vessel, the eighth-worst tragedy in the history of the Great Lakes.

References

1873 ships
Ships built in Ontario
Great Lakes ships
Maritime incidents in September 1882
Shipwrecks of Lake Huron
Steamships of Canada